Shmurda may refer to 
Bobby Shmurda (Ackquille Jean Pollard, born 1994), American rapper
Shmurda She Wrote, debut EP by Bobby Shmurda